General elections were held in Nicaragua on 20 October 1996 to elect the President and the members of the National Assembly. Arnoldo Alemán of the Liberal Alliance (a coalition of the Constitutionalist Liberal Party, Independent Liberal Party for National Unity, Nationalist Liberal Party and Neoliberal Party) was elected President, with the Liberal Alliance also winning 42 of the 93 seats in the National Assembly.

Results

President

National Assembly

By region

References

Elections in Nicaragua
Nicaragua
1996 in Nicaragua
Presidential elections in Nicaragua